"Stranded" is the opening track on Northern Irish singer-songwriter Van Morrison's 2005 album Magic Time.  It is one of the ten original songs written by Morrison that were included on the well-received album.

As described in Allmusic:  "Stranded" has a gorgeous faux doo wop lilt, and an elegant, timeless piano that cascades from the ether as a nocturnal alto saxophone (Morrison) who announces a stolid yet world-weary vocal that unhurriedly moves along to a backing chorus. One can hear traces of The Platters' "Twilight Time" and The Penguins' "Earth Angel" in its grain.

In the lyrics of the song, the singer laments being confused and isolated in a modern world from which he feels disconnected:
I’m stranded at the edge of the world
It’s a world I don’t know

BC Music's reviewer Aaman Lamba notes: "Stranded" is a typical Morrison piece, dealing with being stranded on the shores of a new world, a world changed.  A thoughtful piece, it features a saxophone section of some worth."  (This was played by Morrison.) 
It's leaving me stranded
In my own little island
With my eyes open wide
But I'm feeling stranded

Morrison has frequently performed this song in his live concerts since releasing it.

Appearance on other albums
It is included on the 2007 compilation album, The Best of Van Morrison Volume 3 
It also featured on the 2007 compilation album, Still on Top - The Greatest Hits.

Personnel on original release
Van Morrison – vocals, alto saxophone
Brian Connor – piano
Foggy Lyttle – guitar
David Hayes – bass
Liam Bradley – drums, backing vocals
Jerome Rimson – backing vocals

Notes

2005 songs
Van Morrison songs
Songs written by Van Morrison
Song recordings produced by Van Morrison